Mercy is a 2000 erotic thriller film directed by Damian Harris and starring Ellen Barkin. The movie was based on a novel written by David L. Lindsey.

Plot
Detective Cathy Palmer (Ellen Barkin) is on the trail of an elusive serial killer. During her investigation she meets Vickie Kittrie (Peta Wilson), who belongs to an exclusive club of women who engage in secret sessions of bondage and S&M. Matters become even more complicated when Palmer finds herself attracted to Kittrie, leading to a brief lesbian encounter. Palmer soon learns that each victim belonged to this club of prominent, sexually experimental women. In order to catch the killer, Catherine must trust Vickie to guide her through the dangerous and illicit underground.  One of the strange things that happens in this movie is when Mary (Karen Young, from "Jaws the Revenge" and "The Sopranos") ties down her doctor (Julian Sands) after he dresses up like her mother.  He tells her to act out her aggression by pretending he's her mother.  She bites his nearly nude body in several places and takes out a knife.

Cast
 Ellen Barkin as Detective Cathy Palmer
 Wendy Crewson as Bernadine Mello
 Peta Wilson as Vickie Kittrie
 Karen Young as Mary
 Danielle Marie Straus as Young Mary
 Julian Sands as Dr. Dominick Broussard
 Stephen Baldwin as The Mechanic
 Beau Starr as Lieutenant Fritch
 Marshall Bell as Gil Reynolds
 Bill MacDonald as Detective John Beck
 Stewart Bick as Detective Cushing
 Ellen-Ray Hennessy as Murial Farr
 Lara Daans as Dorothy Samenov
 Claire Burton as Sandra Moser
 Fulvio Cecere as Detective Leeland
 Michael Fletcher as Wendell
 Zehra Leverman as Terry Ross
 Linda V. Carter as Helena
 Melanie Nicholls-King as Jane
 Kevin Rushton as Clyde Barbish 
 Dorothy Bennie as Miss Dawes
 Doug Lennox as Mr. Kittrie
 Jacqueline McLeod as Mrs. Kittrie
 Lacey Von Erich as Vicki's Sister

References

Mercy (2000) at Yahoo! Movies
Mercy (2000) at The New York Times website

External links 
 
 

2000 films
2000s erotic thriller films
American crime thriller films
American independent films
American erotic thriller films
BDSM in films
Films based on American novels
Films based on thriller novels
Films set in Houston
Lesbian-related films
American serial killer films
Franchise Pictures films
Films produced by Elie Samaha
2000 LGBT-related films
American LGBT-related films
2000s English-language films
Films directed by Damian Harris
2000s American films